Terry Alexander (born January 23, 1955) is an American politician. He is a member of the South Carolina House of Representatives from the 59th District, serving since 2007. He is a member of the Democratic party.

Alexander serves on the House Education and Public Works Committee and the Regulations and Administrative Procedures Committee. He is Region V Chair of the National Black Caucus of State Legislators, covering North Carolina and South Carolina.

Political career 
He was one of the introductory speakers at Bernie Sanders' 2020 Presidential Kick-Off Rally in Brooklyn, NY.

2006

References

Living people
1955 births
Democratic Party members of the South Carolina House of Representatives
African-American state legislators in South Carolina
21st-century American politicians
21st-century African-American politicians
20th-century African-American politicians
African-American men in politics
20th-century American politicians